"Angelito" is a song by Bachata group Aventura which featured Judy Santos. This is the first single from their fourth studio album God's Project. This was also the last song Judy Santos recorded with the group.

Track listings
CD single 

"Angelito" (Radio Edit) - 3:36
	
CD maxi 
"Angelito" (Radio Mix) - 3:31
"Angelito" (Dance Radio Mix) - 3:43
"Angelito" (Album Version) - 4:55
"Angelito" (Extended Dance Mix) - 4:41

Charts

References

2005 singles
Aventura (band) songs
Songs written by Romeo Santos
2005 songs
Spanish-language songs